David Alan Reid (born January 14, 1962) is an American politician and retired US Navy Reserve commander. Reid was elected to the Virginia House of Delegates in 2017. He is a Democrat representing the 32nd District, which includes much of eastern Loudoun County in Northern Virginia.

Early life and education

Reid grew up  in Rockbridge County, Virginia, before moving to the United Methodist Children's Home in Richmond, Virginia in 1972. After six years, Reid and his youngest brother were adopted and moved to Tahlequah, Oklahoma, with a foster family.

Reid earned a BA in political science from Northeastern Oklahoma State University in Tahlequah, Oklahoma. He also holds a master's diploma in strategic intelligence from the Joint Military Intelligence College located at the Defense Intelligence Agency in Washington, D.C.

Career

Reid served 23 years in the US Navy Reserve, as a naval intelligence officer, where he retired as a commander (O-5) in 2011. While in the navy, Reid made two deployments to South Korea and one deployment to Iceland.

Political career

Reid ran for the Virginia House of Delegates in the 2017 elections and defeated incumbent Thomas Greason by a margin of 17%. Reid was unchallenged in the 2019 election.

Environmental Initiatives 

Delegate Reid has been an environmental champion in the Virginia General Assembly. In 2021, Delegate Reid introduced HB1979 (Electric Vehicle Rebate Program) which provides for state tax credits when purchasing a new or used EV. However, the program has not been funded, meaning Virginians are not yet eligible for the rebate. Delegate Reid has introduced budget requests to fund the program numerous times, but without success.

References 

1962 births
Living people
People from Lexington, Virginia
People from Richmond, Virginia
People from Tahlequah, Oklahoma
United States Navy reservists
Democratic Party members of the Virginia House of Delegates
American United Methodists
Northeastern State University alumni
National Intelligence University alumni
21st-century American politicians
People from Ashburn, Virginia